This is a list of countries by the number of millionaires by net worth (in United States dollars) based on an annual assessment of wealth and assets compiled and published by the Swiss bank Credit Suisse. According to estimates, in the middle of 2021 there were 56 million people worldwide whose assets exceeded one million dollars, of whom nearly 40% lived in the United States. The total net worth of all millionaires stood at around $158.261 trillion.

Regions by number and percentage of millionaires

Countries by number and percentage of millionaires 

* indicates links to articles on the  economy of the country or territory.

See also
 Millionaire
 List of countries by number of billionaires
 List of countries by share of income of the richest one percent

References 

millionaires